Hugh de la Lynde (fl. 1391–1397) of Bath, Somerset, was an English politician.

He was a Member (MP) of the Parliament of England for Bath in 1391, 1393, and September 1397, and for Chippenham in 1394.

References

Year of birth missing
Year of death missing
English MPs 1391
People from Bath, Somerset
English MPs 1393
English MPs September 1397
English MPs 1394